Lee Jung Hyun 007th is Lee Jung Hyun's seventh album.

The title relates to her as a killer whom she tries to kill her boyfriend who betrays her for another woman. The title song "Suspicious Man" (수상한 남자) brought many Korean people's attention. Unlike her previous mini album "Avaholic" she brings her old style of music. The song "연 (緣)" is the first ballad song that she ever added to her albums.

Track listing

References

Lee Jung-hyun albums
2010 albums
Korean-language albums
Concept albums
James Bond